Centerville City may refer to:
Centerville City School District in Ohio
Centerville City, former name of Centerville, Humboldt County, California